Henry Vahl (1897–1977) was a German stage, film and television actor. Since 1958 he was a star of the Ohnsorg-Theater in Hamburg. His younger brother Bruno Vahl-Berg was also an actor.

Selected filmography
 The Muzzle (1958)
 Heart Without Mercy (1958)
 The Angel Who Pawned Her Harp (1959)
 Pension Schöller (1960)
 Stage Fright (1960)
 Our House in Cameroon (1961)
 Opa wird verkauft (1961, TV film)
 Snow White and the Seven Jugglers (1962)
 Meister Anecker (1965, TV film)
 Kein Auskommen mit dem Einkommen (1966, TV film)
 Tratsch im Treppenhaus (1966, TV film)
 Schneider Nörig (1969, TV film)
 Der Bürgermeisterstuhl (1969, TV film)
 Our Willi Is the Best (1971)
 Wir hau'n den Hauswirt in die Pfanne (1971)
 The Heath Is Green (1972)
 Tears of Blood (1972)
 Spring in Immenhof (1974)

References

Bibliography 
 Gregor Ball & Eberhard Spiess. Heinz Rühmann und seine Filme. Goldmann, 1982.

External links 
 

1897 births
1977 deaths
People from Stralsund
German male television actors
German male film actors
German male stage actors